The Nyangwara are an ethnic group numbering between 25,000 and 30,000 people living in the South Sudan in the state of Central Equatoria. They are part of the Karo people, which also includes the Bari, Mundari, Kakwa, Kuku and Pojulu tribes. They speak Kutuk na Nyangwara.

References

Ethnic groups in South Sudan